This article details the qualifying phase for Judo at the 2016 Summer Paralympics.  The competition at these Games will comprise a total of 132 athletes coming from their respective NPCs; each has been allowed to enter a maximum of 13 (seven for men, six for women, and in either case, one per division). Host nation Brazil has reserved a spot in each of all 13 events, while 13 are made available to NPCs through a Bipartite Commission Invitation.

The remaining judoka must undergo a qualifying process to earn a spot for the Games through the world ranking list prepared by IBSA that begins on December 31, 2014, and then concludes one year later on the same date.

The gold medal winner in each division of the 2014 IBSA World Championships earns a quota place for his or her NPC.

The top 9 men and top 5 women from the world rankings, not including the world champion, in each division must directly qualify, ensuring that the NPC is subjected to a limit of 1 judoka per division. If an NOC contains more than a single male athlete ranked in the top 9, or a single female in the top 6 of the world ranking list, the NPC can decide which of their athletes obtain the quota places.

Men's events

Extra-lightweight (60 kg)

Half-lightweight (66 kg)

Lightweight (73 kg)

Half-middleweight (81 kg)

Middleweight (90 kg)

Half-heavyweight (100 kg)

Heavyweight (+100 kg)

Women's events

Extra-lightweight (48 kg)

Half-lightweight (52 kg)

Lightweight (57 kg)

Half-middleweight (63 kg)

Middleweight (70 kg)

Half-heavyweight (70+ kg)

References

Paralympics, Qualification